The Unitarian Church of South Australia, Inc., is an independent and self-governed church affiliated with the worldwide Unitarian Universalist movement, a member of the Australia and New Zealand Unitarian Universalist Association, and an affiliate member of the Unitarian Universalist Association. It is a socially progressive and inclusive spiritual community, not covenanted by doctrine and dogma, but by liberal religious principles distilled from the essential values of all world religions, as well as the arts, humanities, and sciences.

History

Wakefield Street 

On July 11, 1854 a group of people of the Unitarian Christian denomination met in Adelaide, South Australia and resolved to found their own church and seek a suitable minister from England. John Crawford Woods was selected and arrived on the Quito from London on 19 September 1855. Services were initially held in private houses until October of that year, when the first public service was held in King William Street, Adelaide.

The congregation opened a church in Wakefield Street in 1857. Members of the congregation included prominent South Australians such as Premier of South Australia Sir Henry Ayers, industrialist Alfred Muller Simpson, newspaper editor John Howard Clark and librarian Robert Kay, who was active in the cause of popular education. Writer, teacher, politician, and suffragette Catherine Helen Spence joined the church in 1856, later preaching there occasionally. As a lay leader, she lobbied for greater opportunities for women in education, employment, and political participation. Membership peaked at around 750 in 1881.

Woods resigned in 1887 but it was two years before a suitable replacement was found in the Rev. Robert Cooper Dendy  of Tenterden, Kent, and Woods continued serving until May 1889. Dendy left in 1893 and was replaced by Rev. Alexander Wilson, who resigned in 1902.

Shady Grove 
In 1858, British immigrant John Monk and his sons set about built a school on a Shady Grove property, near Hahndorf in the Adelaide Hills. Later, this building and the surrounding land, including a cemetery, were gifted to the Unitarian Church of South Australia and converted into a branch chapel. On Christmas Eve 1865, the Rev. J. Crawford Woods, from the larger church, officiated at an opening event. From the chapel's founding in 1865 to 1881, Francis Duffield was the first official lay leader of the Shady Grove congregation.

Today, the property is heritage listed with the South Australia Heritage Register. The property remains primarily virgin scrub and grows many wildflowers. A dedicated team of bush care workers meet regularly to maintain the property. The Shady Grove chapel is still used regularly by a small but active congregation.

Recent years 
In the twentieth century, the fortunes of the congregation fluctuated, largely depending on the resident minister. Rev George Hale, while highly regarded for his integrity and oratory, alienated many for his pacifist stance during WWII. The Wakefield Street church, one of Adelaide’s more impressive religious buildings in its day, became in the 1960s increasingly expensive to maintain by the diminishing congregation, and the congregation decided to divest itself of the valuable property and move to more suitable premises in the suburbs. The property was sold to the South Australian Public Service Association in 1971, and the building demolished in 1973.

New church premises in suburban Norwood, South Australia, including an adjoining manse for the minister, were designed by architect Eric von Schramek in 1970. The stained glass windows and the organ from the old church were incorporated into the interior decoration of the new building.

The congregation removed "Christian" from the church's name in 1977. As of 2018, the congregation holds two services per week and engages in community outreach, particularly focused on social justice issues. At the 2011 census, there were 435 Unitarian Universalist adherents in South Australia, as compared to 213 in 2006. Experiencing a significant growth of 104.2% in these years, Unitarian Universalism was the 7th fastest growing religion in South Australia as of 2011. At this time, a third of Australia's Unitarian Universalists resided in South Australia.

References 

Unitarian Universalist churches in Australia
Christian denominations in Australia